Maryna Volodymyrivna Zanevska (born 24 August 1993) is a Ukrainian-born Belgian tennis player. She has a career-high singles ranking of world No. 62, achieved on 23 May 2022, and a WTA doubles ranking of No. 86, reached on 16 June 2014. Zanevska has won one WTA Tour singles title and one WTA Challenger singles and one doubles titles and has also reached four WTA doubles finals.

Personal life
Zanevska has been training in Belgium since 2008, and resides in Namur. Born in Ukraine, she received Belgian citizenship in October 2016.

She has been coached by the "6th Sense Academy" of Justine Henin and Carlos Rodríguez.

Junior career
Junior Grand Slam results - Singles:
 Australian Open: 3R (2010)
 French Open: 3R (2011)
 Wimbledon: 1R (2009)
 US Open: 2R (2009)

Junior Grand Slam results - Doubles:
 Australian Open: 1R (2009, 2010)
 French Open: W (2011)
 Wimbledon: 2R (2009)
 US Open: W (2009)

Career
Zanevska is a winner of the 2009 US Open junior title with her Russian doubles partner Valeria Solovyeva, and of the 2011 French Open junior title with another Russian doubles partner, Irina Khromacheva.

Zanevska won her maiden WTA singles title at the 2021 WTA Poland Open.

Performance timeline

Only main-draw results in WTA Tour, Grand Slam tournaments, Fed Cup/Billie Jean King Cup and Olympic Games are included in win–loss records.

Singles
Current after the 2023 Indian Wells Open.

Doubles

WTA career finals

Singles: 1 (title)

Doubles: 4 (4 runner-ups)

WTA Challenger finals

Singles: 1 (title)

Doubles: 1 (title)

ITF Circuit finals

Singles: 32 (19 titles, 12 runner–ups, 1 not played)

Doubles: 25 (13 titles, 12 runner–ups)

Junior Grand Slam tournament finals

Girls' doubles: 2 (2 titles)

Notes

References

External links

 
 
 

Ukrainian female tennis players
1993 births
Living people
Sportspeople from Odesa
US Open (tennis) junior champions
French Open junior champions
Grand Slam (tennis) champions in girls' doubles
Belgian female tennis players
Ukrainian emigrants to Belgium
Naturalised citizens of Belgium